Léon Binoche (16 August 1878 – 28 August 1962) was a French rugby union player who competed in the 1900 Summer Olympics. He was a member of the French rugby union team, which won the gold medal. His great-niece is the actress Juliette Binoche.

References

External links

profile
Biography of Léon Binoche

1878 births
1962 deaths
Sportspeople from Yonne
French rugby union players
Rugby union players at the 1900 Summer Olympics
Olympic rugby union players of France
Olympic gold medalists for France
Medalists at the 1900 Summer Olympics